Ali Daïra (born February 2, 1981) is an Algerian football player. He currently plays for CA Batna in the Algerian Ligue Professionnelle 1.

References

External links
 

1981 births
Algerian footballers
Algerian Ligue Professionnelle 1 players
Algerian Ligue 2 players
CA Batna players
Living people
MO Constantine players
Sportspeople from Constantine, Algeria
Association football defenders
21st-century Algerian people